The Petit Ried (occasionally referred to as Ried-Nord) is located in north-eastern Alsace.
It stretches between the Robertsau Forest in Strasbourg in the south, and Lauterbourg in the north. It borders on Outre-Forêt. The Petit Ried shows a typical Ried landscape. It spreads over a narrow strip along the river Rhine. It is accessible thanks to the railway Strasbourg-Lauterbourg, as well as the motorway A35 between Hœrdt and Lauterbourg.

In the Petit Ried, three rivers flow into the Rhine River:

 the Ill in Offendorf
 the Moder in Beinheim
 the Sauer in Munchhausen, which actually takes its source in Germany

To the east, the Black Forest with the Hornisgrinde stands out against the horizon. The Vosges are more inconspicuous because they lie farther away, and are not as high as the Black Forest.

The Petit Ried is densely populated, and is relatively rich, as many cross-border workers
live there.

Baggersee 
Numerous sand and gravel pits (which are locally called Baggersee, as in nearby Germany ) are in operation (in La Wantzenau, Hoerdt and Offendorf for instance).
Old pits are still used for recreational activities like bathing (in Reichstett, Bischheim and in Gambsheim, for instance) or diving.

Nature reserves 
Two national nature reserves are located in the Petit Ried, more precisely:
 Sauer delta Nature Reserve in Munchhausen
 Offendorf Forest Nature Reserve in Offendorf

Fish pass 
Both dams in Iffezheim (D) and in Gambsheim (F) are equipped with a fish pass. In Gambsheim, it is possible to observe fish migration in a small museum. Downstream of Beinheim, there are no more dams, which explains why the zone between Beinheim and Lauterbourg is so interesting from an environmental point of view.
This is the place where the Sauer Delta Nature Reserve is located. But the Rhine is still subjected to the needs of navigation.

Renewable energies 
The starch manufacturer Roquette Frères in Beinheim is supplied with heat from the terrestrial heat plant in Rittershoffen.
The dams in Gambsheim and Iffezheim produce electricity. In Gambsheim the French grid is fed,
whereas the German grid is fed in Iffezheim.
The biogas produced by the sewage plant in Strasbourg is fed into the French gas network.

Tourism 
There are tourism offices in Gambsheim, Soufflenheim, Seltz and Lauterbourg.
Soufflenheim is renowned for its coloured Alsatian potteries.
In Offendorf a barge houses the inland water shipping Museum.
The Gambsheim locks are equipped with France's largest sluices.

Adjacent Zone 
The Haguenau Forest plays an important role, as a link between the Northern Vosges
and the Petit Ried. It constitutes as such a major wildlife corridor.

See also 
 Grand Ried

References

External links 
 water table-Website Aprona (French)
 Rhine gravel (French)
 Fossils from Offendorf (French)
 Fossils from Soufflenheim Website Association Strasbourgeoise des Amis de la Minéralogie 67 (French)

Geography of Bas-Rhin